Robert Sack may refer to:
                    
Robert D. Sack, judge
Robert L. Sack, M.D.